Alpes–Isère Airport (formerly Grenoble-Isère Airport) or Aéroport Alpes–Isère , is an international airport serving Grenoble which is situated 2.5 km north-northwest of Saint-Étienne-de-Saint-Geoirs and 40 km west-northwest of Grenoble, both communes in the Isère, département of France. The airport handled 307,979 passengers in 2019 and mostly features winter seasonal leisure traffic.

Formerly known as Grenoble–Saint-Geoirs Airport since 1968 Winter Olympics, the appellation, Isere, refers to the department of Isère. A campus of the École nationale de l'aviation civile is also located at the airport.

Airlines and destinations

The following airlines operate regular scheduled and charter flights to and from Alpes–Isère Airport:

Statistics

Ground transport 
Coach links connect the airport with the centre of Grenoble.

References

External links 

 Official website 
 Aéroport de Grenoble-Isère (Union des Aéroports Français) 
 

Airports in Auvergne-Rhône-Alpes
Transport in Grenoble
Buildings and structures in Isère